Wang Jianlin (born 24 October 1954) is a Chinese business magnate, investor and philanthropist. He is the chairman, founder, and majority shareholder of the Dalian Wanda Group, one of China's foremost conglomerate companies, which is also well known for being China's largest real estate development company and the world's largest movie theater operator. He previously owned 17% of the Spanish football club Atlético Madrid. In 2016, Wang reached a deal with FIFA to launch the China Cup, in which national football teams compete in Nanning, Guangxi each year.

Wang has been the economic consultant for Yunnan province, as well as a construction consultant of the Guiyang government, and was named honourable citizen of Changchun, and "outstanding contributor" to the construction of Dalian.

As of November 2020, Wang is estimated by Forbes to have a net worth of US$14.4 billion, making him one of the richest men in China.

Early life and career

Wang Jianlin was born on 24 October 1954, in Cangxi County, Guangyuan, Sichuan, as the oldest of five boys. His father Wang Yiquan was a peasant who fought for Mao Zedong's People's Liberation Army during the Long March (October 1934–October 1935). Retired from the army just before the Korean War, his father, working for the forestry service, and mother Qin Jialin settled in a village in Jinchuan County, Sichuan, where their son would grow up. His given name at birth was originally 建林 which can be translated as 'forest builder'.

Wang became a soldier at age 15, lying about his age, and made his way up in the army ranks quickly, becoming a commander at age 27. During his time in the army, he served in Chengdu, before being sent to the Shenyang Military Region in 1970. After 17 years in the army, in 1986 Wang started working as the office administrator for the Xigang District in the city of Dalian. In 1988, using a $80,000 loan, he took over the small property developer Xigang Residential Development. In 1992, as the company went public as one of the first in a pilot program, he was promoted to general manager and changed the name to Dalian Wanda.

His conglomerate company owns over 21.57 million square metres of prime commercial real estate across the Chinese mainland, consisting of 168 Wanda Shopping Plazas, 82 luxury hotels, 213 cinemas, 99 department stores, and 54 karaoke centres. The company has also became the world's largest theatre owner in 2012 when it acquired AMC Theatres. He listed it on the New York Stock Exchange in December. He flew in leading Hollywood celebrities Leonardo DiCaprio, Kate Beckinsale, and John Travolta to help launch a  mini-Hollywood in the coastal city of Qingdao in January 2014.

Wanda Group acquired the landmark Edificio España building in Madrid, Spain, in March 2014 from Grupo Santander for "about a third less than the €389 million that Banco Santander paid in 2005, at the height of Spain's construction boom". Previously, Dalian Wanda had taken on billion-dollar hotel development projects in London and New York, as well as property projects in India.

In 2014, he acquired land at 9900 Wilshire Boulevard in Beverly Hills, California to build the American headquarters named "One Beverly Hills" of his entertainment company.

He sold his stake to Quantum Pacific Group for an undisclosed fee in 2018.

In 2016, Wang launched a direct competition with Disney by declaring that he wants to make sure Shanghai Disneyland Park doesn't make any money in China by launching over a dozen competing amusement parks. Wanda already owns Legendary Entertainment, co-producer of films such as Jurassic World, and U.S. cinema chain AMC Entertainment Holdings.

The Economist has called Wang "a man of Napoleonic ambition", citing his military background in the PLA, where he rose from border guard to regimental commander. He enforces "iron discipline" in the workplace, where employees are fined when they violate the company's conservative dress code. Despite his age, he has a "trim figure".

Politics and philanthropy
At the age of 15, Wang started his 17-year service with the People's Liberation Army, initially as a border guard before rising to become a regimental commander. In 1976, he joined the Communist Party of China. He served as deputy to the 17th National Congress.

Wang is a delegate to the Chinese National People's Congress. He was twice named CCTV's "Economic Person of the Year". He is the vice chairman of the All-China Federation of Industry and Commerce, and has been a member of the Chinese People's Political Consultative Conference since 2008.

He is vice chair of the China Charity Confederation; vice chair of the China Folk Chamber of Commerce; vice chair of the China Enterprise Confederation and the China Enterprise Directors Association; vice chair of the China General Chamber of Commerce; vice-chair of the Global Advisory Council of Harvard University.

In 2011, he donated  to charitable causes, such as underwriting the restoration of an ancient temple in Nanjing. In 2014-2015 he donated  for the restoration of the Electric Fountain in Beverly Hills, California. In 2017 he donated CNY 20 million to help 2017 Sichuan landslide victims, it was speculated that he empathized especially with the region having grown up in Ngawa Prefecture himself.

Wang maintains a close relationship with the Chinese Communist Party. The New York Times reported in 2015 that relatives of high-ranking Party officials amassed a stake in the company prior to the IPO of Dalian Wanda which appreciated to over $1.1 billion when the company was listed. These relatives include Qi Qiaoqiao, the sister of Xi Jinping, as well as  the daughter of  Wen Jiabao.

However, Wang's personal motto is “stay close to the government and distant from politics.” He believes entrepreneurs should be "close" to the government and "clear" from the government as well. "If the government never talk to entrepreneurs, they'll never know what entrepreneurs want to invest, develop or solve."

In 2010, Wang donated a billion yuan (US$156 million) to the city of Nanjing for reconstruction of the Porcelain Tower of Nanjing . This is reported to be the largest single personal donation ever made in China.

Wealth 
Wang Jianlin has been ranked prominently in worldwide billionaire lists for years.

However, on May 14, Jack Ma overtook Wang Jianlin as the richest man in China, thanks to Ma's Alibaba Group's increases in stock prices.

In 2020, Wang tumbled down the rich list as his real estate empire and movie theatre chains both sharply declined in the wake of the COVID-19 pandemic. Forbes ranked him outside the top 10 in its 2020 list of Richest Chinese Billionaires with an estimated net worth of $14 billion.

As of 11/30/2022, Forbes ranked him 39th in China Rich List and 138th its 2022 World's Billionaires list with an estimated net worth of $7.9 billion.

Personal life
He is married to Lin Ning, and has a son, Wang Sicong (born 1988), educated at Winchester College and University College London in the UK. Wang Sicong is currently a board member of the Wanda Group and a venture capitalist in China through his Beijing-based private equity fund, Prometheus Capital (普思投资).

Wang is a follower of Buddhism, although he considers himself not religious. Owing to his years of military service, he lives with military discipline. He is also noted for singing Tibetan and Mongolian folk songs. His hobbies are collecting art and singing karaoke.

In December 2015 Wang bought 15a Kensington Palace Gardens, London, for £80 million. The house was previously lived in by the Ukrainian billionaire, Leonard Blavatnik, who rented it during lengthy works on the house he owns opposite.

In July 2016, Wang released his book, The Wanda Way: The managerial philosophy and values of one of China's largest companies. The book was published globally by LID Publishing. The book includes his renowned 2013 China Central Television Voice interview, his speech and question-and-answer session to the Harvard Business School, and Wang's business philosophy on Wanda's real estate, resort, and movie units.

Bibliography
 The Wanda Way: The managerial philosophy and values of one of China's largest companies (2016)

Notes

References

1954 births
Living people
20th-century Chinese businesspeople
21st-century Chinese businesspeople
Billionaires from Sichuan
Businesspeople from Sichuan
Chinese Buddhists
Chinese business writers
Chinese chief executives
Chinese Communist Party politicians from Sichuan
Chinese company founders
Chinese football chairmen and investors
Chinese investors
Chinese philanthropists
Chinese real estate businesspeople
Dalian Wanda Group people
Liaoning University alumni
Members of the Standing Committee of the 11th Chinese People's Political Consultative Conference
People's Liberation Army personnel
People's Republic of China politicians from Sichuan
Politicians from Guangyuan
Private equity and venture capital investors
Real estate company founders
Writers from Guangyuan